The St. Michael's Church is a Gothic-style Roman Catholic church in Cluj-Napoca. It is the second largest church (after the Biserica Neagră of Brașov) in the geographical region of Transylvania, Romania. The nave is 50 meters long and 24 meters wide, the apse is 20×10 m. The tower with its height of 76 meter (80 meter including the cross) is the highest one in Transylvania.

History
The construction was begun probably in place of the Saint James Chapel. The financing of the church was partly done by the citizens, partly from the income of indulgences. The first related document, dating back to 1349 and signed by the archbishop of Avignon and fifteen other bishops, grants the indulgence for those contributing to the illumination and furniture of the Saint Michael Church. The construction was completed between 1442 and 1447, the old tower being built between 1511 and 1545. The tower that stands today was erected in 1862.

The church was converted, along with the local population, to Lutheran Protestantism between 1545 and 1566. Then the more radical Unitarian party took it over in the period 1566–1716. At last, it was confiscated in the counter reformation by the Catholic Church with the support of the Habsburg government.

The Baroque clock tower was replaced in the 19th century by a new one, built in the Gothic Revival style (1837–1862).

Events
Some important historical events that took place in the church:
 26 July 1551: Queen Isabella of Hungary gives the Hungarian Crown to General Castaldo, the deputy of Ferdinand I., and cedes with that Hungary and Transylvania
 23 October 1556: Queen Isabella returns and takes back the reign of Transylvania, in the name of her son, the child John II Sigismund Zápolya
 27 March 1601: the third investiture of Sigismund Báthory as Prince of Transylvania 
 12 February 1607: election of Sigismund Rákóczi as Prince of Transylvania 
 7 March 1608: election of Gabriel Báthory as Prince of Transylvania 
 13 October 1613: election of Gabriel Bethlen as Prince of Transylvania 
 18 May 1944: the speech of Áron Márton, bishop of the Roman Catholic Church in Transylvania in which he strongly condemned the deportation of Jews.

Description
The west portal is decorated with the three coats of arms of Sigismund as King of Hungary, as King of Bohemia and as Holy Roman Emperor.

The oldest of its sections is the altar, inaugurated in 1390, while the newest part is the Gothic Revival-style clock tower, which was built in 1837–1862 and replaced a Baroque predecessor.

Gallery

See also
 Matthias Corvinus Monument (1902) stands in the square south of the church
 Saint Michael: Roman Catholic traditions and views

References

External links

 Official page on the website of the diocese of Alba Iulia

Churches in Cluj-Napoca
15th-century Roman Catholic church buildings in Romania
Roman Catholic churches completed in 1487
Medieval architecture
Gothic architecture in Romania
Historic monuments in Cluj County
Hall churches
Roman Catholic Archdiocese of Alba Iulia